WCEV (1450 AM) was a radio station licensed to Cicero, Illinois, United States. Serving the Chicago area, WCEV was owned by Migala Communications Corporation, and aired a time brokered ethnic programming format.

History
After WVON moved from 1450 AM to 1390 AM in 1975, both Migala Communications and Midway Broadcasting filed applications to establish a new station on the vacated frequency. Between 1976 and 1979, WFMT was granted an interim license to simulcast on 1450 AM. In 1979, Migala and Midway reached an agreement to divide the broadcast week between them in a time sharing agreement for two stations. 

WCEV was on the air from 1 PM to 10 PM Monday through Friday; Midway's WXOL broadcast on 1450 during the remaining hours. The two stations shared a transmitter site in South Lawndale, with WCEV's studios in Chicago's Portage Park neighborhood.

On January 9, 2020, Robert Feder reported that WCEV would be going out of business after 40 years on the air. The station signed off for the final time on January 20, 2020, at 10 PM. WCEV's license was cancelled by the FCC on July 30, 2021.

Gallery

References

External links
FCC Station Search Details: DWCEV (Facility ID: 42137)
FCC History Cards for WCEV (covering 1975-1980)

CEV
Radio stations established in 1979
Radio stations disestablished in 2021
1979 establishments in Illinois
2021 disestablishments in Illinois
Defunct radio stations in the United States
CEV